James Bilbrough (3 May 1911 – 5 November 1944) was a South African cricketer. He played in three first-class matches for Eastern Province in 1928/29.

See also
 List of Eastern Province representative cricketers

References

External links
 

1911 births
1944 deaths
South African cricketers
Eastern Province cricketers
People from Springs, Gauteng